Like Mike is a 2002 film directed by John Schultz.

Like Mike may also refer to:

Like Mike (soundtrack), soundtrack album of the 2002 film
Like Mike 2: Streetball, American direct-to-video film sequel to Like Mike
Like Mike (DJ), real name Michael Thivaios, part of the Belgian DJ duo Dimitri Vegas & Like Mike

See also
 I Like Mike (disambiguation)
 "Be Like Mike", 1992 commercial featuring Michael Jordan